Mishkan is the Hebrew word for the dwelling place of God, or the Tabernacle. It may refer to:

The Israelite Tabernacle
Mishkan Chicago, a Progressive Jewish Spiritual Community
The Mishkan T'filah, an American Reform Jewish Prayer Book